Dartmouth College is located in the rural town of Hanover in the Upper Valley of the Connecticut River in the New England state of New Hampshire. Dartmouth's  campus centered on the Green makes the institution the largest private landowner in the town of Hanover, and its landholdings and facilities are valued at an estimated $419 million. Dartmouth's campus buildings vary in age from several early 19th century buildings to a number of ongoing construction projects. Most of Dartmouth's buildings are designed in the Georgian style, a theme which has been preserved in recent architectural additions.

Undergraduate college facilities

Academic and administrative buildings

House communities system 
Dartmouth operates a system of six residential colleges (called "houses") similar to those found at fellow Ivy League institutions Harvard and Yale as well as the universities of Oxford and Cambridge in the United Kingdom. Although every Dartmouth undergraduate is a member of a house, some students choose to live in Greek houses, unaffiliated on-campus housing or move off campus entirely. Dartmouth houses approximately 3,300 students in its facilities, or about 85% of the student body; the remaining 15% opt to live in off-campus housing.

Allen House

East Wheelock House

North Park House

School House

South House

West House

Unaffiliated housing

Greek houses and other undergraduate societies

Graduate school facilities

Geisel School of Medicine 
The buildings of the Geisel School of Medicine are clustered on the north end of the Dartmouth campus, known as the "north campus."

Thayer School of Engineering 
The Thayer School of Engineering is located adjacent to the Tuck School of Business on the western edge of campus, near the Connecticut River. It currently comprises two buildings, and it shares the Murdough Center (listed under Tuck) with the Tuck School of Business.

Tuck School of Business 
Like the Thayer School of Engineering, the Tuck School of Business is located in a complex on the western side of campus, along the Connecticut River.

Athletic and outdoor recreation buildings

Other facilities

Planned buildings

References

External links 
Dartmo.: The Buildings of Dartmouth College
Map of Dartmouth College

 
Dartmouth College
Dartmouth College